GLOBIO is the registered name for the American, Portland, Oregon based non-profit charity called the Foundation for Global Biodiversity Education for Children. It has developed internet-based and hands-on educational resources to teach children about biological and cultural diversity since its foundation by the environmental photographer Gerry Ellis in 2001.
f
Web resources developed by GLOBIO include the children centered online multimedia encyclopedia named Glossopedia and the Great Ape photo-journalist project named GreatApes2020.

GLOBIO is funded by Toyota USA Foundation grant and private donations. Its partners include the Wolong Nature Reserve in China, Folkmanis Puppets, and the North American Association for Environmental Education.

See also

Sustainability
Biodiversity
Global warming
Ecology
Earth Science
Natural environment

References

External links
 GLOBIO Home page
 GLOSSOPEDIA Project home page
 GreatApes2020 Project home page

Environmental organizations based in the United States